Garbham is a village panchayat in Merakamudidam mandal of Vizianagaram district in Andhra Pradesh, India.

Geography
It has an average elevation of 108 meters (357 feet).

References

Villages in Vizianagaram district